Bvdub is an American electronic music producer originally from the San Francisco Bay Area. Since 2007 he has released more than 40 albums and EPs under this name and other pseudonyms including his birth name, Brock Van Wey. Residing in Shaoxing, China, he produces ambient and ambient techno music that has received critical acclaim from the likes of online magazines Resident Advisor, Headphone Commute and Gridface. His first release as Brock Van Wey, White Clouds Drift On And On, was included in RA's Top 20 Albums of 2009.

Overview 
Van Wey was born in 1974 and grew up in Livermore near San Francisco. He was classically trained as a child and from the age of five he was taught violin and, later, piano. By age eleven he had composed his first piece of music for the trio of cello, violin and viola and had written several more pieces by his mid-teens. Feeling that he did not actually enjoy classical music (and preferring instead to "remix" the pieces he learned in his head) he eventually gave it up altogether. In the early 90s he heard, by chance, a deep house mix tape that would inspire him to pursue electronic music. He was soon performing as a deep house and ambient DJ and appearing regularly at raves in San Francisco, initially under his own name and later under the bvdub moniker. Van Wey composed his first electronic piece in 1993 - an industrial techno/classical track - that differed significantly in style to the music he would later produce.

In 2001, Brock moved to China, having become disillusioned with the scene in San Francisco,  and sought to make a fresh start in a country that had always held a fascination for him. He began work as a professor of English, teaching over 200 students. It was not until 2006 that he started to produce his own music after a friend spent time teaching him the finer details of various pieces of hardware and software. His first release as bvdub was Strength In Solitude LP in 2007, an album which comprises the first six tracks he created in the order that they were made.

In 2007 Van Wey founded the label Quietus Recordings in response to his friends' music being turned down by other record labels for being "too self-indulgent" or "too deep". Creating the label allowed bvdub and others to release their most personal compositions without fear of it being rejected. The label, in fact, encourages its artists to present only the music by which they would want to be remembered. To make each release as personal as possible, Van Wey takes the photos for the CD label and the cover art himself whilst listening to the music that the images are to accompany. The label has released bvdub's own recordings as well as productions by Quantec and Arc Of Doves.

After returning to China, following a period of living once more in San Francisco, a mutual friend put Van Wey in touch with indie label Darla Records. A fruitful relationship blossomed that has seen bvdub release several albums on the label to date including 2011's Resistance Is Beautiful and 2012's Serenity.

In 2018 he was part of "The Ambient Files", a mix CD project by Stars Over Foy.

Name 

The name bvdub was given to Brock by a colleague and is simply a shortening of his initials, BVW, rather than being intended to denote dub or dub techno music. Brock describes his own music as electronic, ambient and ambient techno (though prefers not to categorize it at all) and has stated that he has never produced anything he would associate with dub. However, he has worked with dub techno label and production duo Echospace, who released his album White Clouds Drift On And On and whose member Intrusion remixed it in full.

Discography

Albums 
2007 Strength In Solitude LP (2600 Records)
2009 We Were The Sun (Quietus Recordings)
2009 A Prayer To False Gods (Shoreless Recordings)
2009 White Clouds Drift On And On (as Brock Van Wey) (echospace)
2010 The Art Of Dying Alone (Glacial Movements Records)
2010 A Silent Reign (Styrax Records)
2011 Tribes At The Temple Of Silence (Home Normal)
2011 One Last Look At The Sea (Quietus Recordings)
2011 The Truth Hurts (with Ian Hawgood) (Nomadic Kids Republic)
2011 Songs For A Friend I Left Behind (Distant Noise Records)
2011 I Remember (Translations of Mørketid) (Glacial Movements Records)
2011 121 years
2011 Resistance Is Beautiful (Darla Records)
2011 Then (AY)
2012 The First Day (Home Normal)
2012 Don’t Say You Know (Darla Records)
2012 Serenity (Darla Records)
2012 Strangers No More (With Or Without You)
2012 All Is Forgiven (n5MD)
2013 A Careful Ecstasy (Darla Records)
2013 At Night This City Becomes The Sea (AY)
2013 Born In Tokyo (n5MD)
2013 Erebus (with Loscil) (Glacial Movements Records)
2014 I'll Only Break Your Heart (Darla Records)
2014 Home (as Brock Van Wey) (echospace)
2014 A History Of Distance (n5MD)
2014 Tanto (Quietus Recordings)
2015 A Step In The Dark (AY)
2015 Safety In A Number (Not On Label (Bvdub Self-Released))
2017 Epilogues for the End of the Sky (Glacial Movements)
2017 Heartless (n5MD)
2018 A Different Definition of Love (Dronarivm)
2018 Drowning in Daylight (Apollo)
2019 Explosions in Slow Motion (n5MD)
2020 Ten Times the World Lied (Glacial Movements)
2020 Burn Back Time (Silent Reign)
2020 101 Rooms (self-released)
2020 Wrath & Apathy (n5MD)

Compilations 

2011 Air Texture Volume 1 (with  Andrew Thomas) (Air Texture)
2015 Lost Ambient (Not On Label (Bvdub Self-Released))
2015 Tech From Times Past (Not On Label (Bvdub Self-Released))

References

External links
 

Year of birth missing (living people)
Living people
Deep house musicians
Darla Records artists